Sallyanne Short (born 6 March 1968) is a Welsh former sprinter who competed in the 100 metres and 200 metres. She represented Great Britain in the 4 x 100 metres relay at the 1988 Olympic Games in Seoul.

Career
Short was born in Newport, Wales and began her international career in 1986. She represented Great Britain at the World Junior Championships in Athens and Wales at the Commonwealth Games in Edinburgh, where she won a bronze medal in the 4 × 100 m relay.

In 1988, she earned relay selection for the Seoul Olympics. The British quartet of Short, Bev Kinch, Simmone Jacobs and Paula Dunn, reached the semi-finals, running 43.50 to  miss the final by just six hundredths of a second.

At her second Commonwealth Games in Auckland, January 1990, she reached the finals of both the 100 metres and 200 metres, finishing fifth in the 100 m in 11.41 and sixth in the 200 m in 23.35. In the summer, she won the UK National title at 100 metres and competed in the 200 m at the European Championships in Split.

Short was unlucky to miss Olympic selection in 1992. At the Olympic trials in Birmingham, she was third in the 200 metres, but was the top UK athlete (Australian's Melinda Gainsford and Melissa Moore were 1st and 2nd). Short however, ran 23.24, just outside the qualifying standard of 23.20. Having been unable to attain this time in subsequent races, she did achieve the 100 m standard of 11.40, with 11.39 in Cwmbran. Unfortunately she achieved this just days after the selection deadline. The UK selectors decided not to send a 4 × 100 m squad to Barcelona. She retired in 1995.

Short held the Welsh 100 m record with her 11.39 from 1992 until 2022, when it was beaten by Hannah Brier. The record had previous been equalled by Briar and Elaine O'Neill.

Achievements
UK 100 metres Champion (1990)
3 Times Welsh 100 metres Champion (1986,87,92)
7 Times Welsh 200 metres Champion (1986,87,88,89,90,92,94)

References

1968 births
Sportspeople from Newport, Wales
Welsh female sprinters
Living people
Athletes (track and field) at the 1988 Summer Olympics
Olympic athletes of Great Britain
Athletes (track and field) at the 1986 Commonwealth Games
Athletes (track and field) at the 1990 Commonwealth Games
Commonwealth Games bronze medallists for Wales
Commonwealth Games medallists in athletics
Olympic female sprinters
Medallists at the 1986 Commonwealth Games